The Battle of Tábor took place in the early morning hours of 30 June 1420 in a locality between  and the Lužnice near the walls of a newly emerging Hussite village called Tábor. Between 3,000 and 9,000 Taborites, including women and children, remained in the village after a Hussite detachment left for Prague. Taking advantage of their weakened state, Oldřich II of Rosenberg laid siege to the village. He commanded a force composed of his own gunmen and Austrian mercenaries lead by Lipolt Krajíř of Krajek, the governor of České Budějovice.

Learning of the siege, Mikuláš of Hus left Prague with 350 cavalry and returned to Tábor. In the early morning of 30 June 1420, he attacked the sleeping besiegers. Oldřich II of Rosenberg and his allies were caught off-guard by the attack and scattered, suffering heavy losses in their retreat. The Hussite victory lifted a week long siege, while Oldřich II missed the opportunity to eliminate the base of radical Hussites in the immediate vicinity of his estates.

References

1420 in Europe
Tábor 1420
Battles in Bohemia
Conflicts in 1420
History of the South Bohemian Region